The orange-billed sparrow (Arremon aurantiirostris) is a species of bird in the family Passerellidae.
In Central America it is found in Belize, Costa Rica, Guatemala, Honduras, Mexico, Nicaragua and Panama. In northwestern South America the orange-billed sparrow is found in Colombia, Ecuador and northern Peru. The species are black and as the name suggests, have an orange bill. Its natural habitat is subtropical or tropical moist lowland forest.

References

Further reading

External links
Orange-billed sparrow photo gallery VIREO Photo
Photo; Article chandra.as.utexas.edu

orange-billed sparrow
Birds of Mexico
Birds of Central America
Birds of Colombia
Birds of Ecuador
Birds of Peru
orange-billed sparrow
Taxonomy articles created by Polbot